Democratic Convention may refer to:

Democratic Convention (France), a political party in France
Democratic Convention (San Marino), a defunct political party in San Marino
Democratic Convention of African Peoples, a political party in Togo
Democratic Convention of Moldova, a defunct political alliance in Moldova
Democratic National Convention, American Democratic Party presidential nominating events